Mark Tullio Strukelj (born 23 June 1962) is an Italian former professional footballer who played as a midfielder. A coach, he is currently in charge as Attilio Tesser's assistant at Modena.

Early life
Strukelj's parents emigrated from Trieste to Australia before settling in England, where he was born to an Italian father and an English mother.

Playing career
Strukelj played one season in the Serie A for A.S. Roma (1983–84), mostly as a backup to Brazilian star Paulo Roberto Falcão, winning the Coppa Italia. He also came on as a substitute with 5 minutes to go in extra time in the 1984 European Cup Final against Liverpool, a club of which he is a fan; Roma lost in the subsequent penalty shoot-out.

His career was hampered by the chronic injury of his ankle that forced him to retire at the age of 30.

Coaching career
After starting a career as a youth coach at Triestina, he became Attilio Tesser's right-hand man on all of his coaching roles from 2003 onwards.

Personal life
Strukelj was born in England to an Italian father and an English mother, and moved to Trieste (the city of origin of his father) with his family at the age of 2. He spent occasionally time in England with his maternal grandparents, which led him to become a Liverpool fan.

His son Kevin Strukelj is also a professional footballer.

Honours
Roma
 Coppa Italia winner: 1983–84.

References 

1962 births
Living people
Italian footballers
Serie A players
U.S. Triestina Calcio 1918 players
A.S. Roma players
Pisa S.C. players
Treviso F.B.C. 1993 players
S.S. Arezzo players
U.S. Pistoiese 1921 players
S.S.D. Castel San Pietro Terme Calcio players
Association football midfielders
Italian people of English descent
Italian people of Slovene descent
People from Dorking
Footballers from Surrey